Nick Kokonas is an American restaurant executive and author.

Early life and education
Born and raised in Chicago, Kokonas graduated from Colgate University with a degree in philosophy.

Career
Prior to meeting Grant Achatz and forming their business partnership, Kokonas was the owner of a derivatives trading firm for 10 years, and was an investor and entrepreneur.

Kokonas's restaurants Next, Alinea, and The Aviary served as a testing and development ground for his proprietary ticketing system called Tock. Kokonas's system allows for dynamic pricing for restaurant tickets/reservations. Some of the earliest adopters include, Thomas Keller's The French Laundry and Per Se and Daniel Patterson's Coi.

Personal life
Kokonas and his wife, Dagmara, have two sons.

Published works
Grant Achatz and Nick Kokonas, Life, on the Line: A Chef's Story of Chasing Greatness, Facing Death, and Redefining the Way We Eat March 6, 2012

References

Living people
People from Chicago
Colgate University alumni
American restaurateurs
Year of birth missing (living people)